The inauguration of the President of Colombia is made up of various ceremonies and traditions carried out on August 7 every four years. Through democratic elections or coups, resignations and deaths, presidential inaugurations have been important events in the history of Colombia, which at the same time mark the beginning of new eras.

Schedule

Inaugural ceremony
The Palacio de San Carlos, today the headquarters of the Ministry of Foreign Affairs, is a place of historical relevance for being the first official residence of the Colombian head of state from 1828 to 1937. The elected presidents leave from here with their families to the center of the Congress of the Republic where the inauguration ceremony is usually held where the new head of state of the country is sworn in, each president gives his own touch to his respective ceremony since 1984 the ceremonies are usually of great relevance and great assistance depending on the impact of the elected president.

Since 1888, it has been a tradition to hold the inauguration ceremony for the presidency on August 7 outside the national congress, although on some occasions it is usually held privately in the facilities inside said enclosure, Álvaro Uribe, president of Colombia, between 2002 and 2010, chose to inaugurate its presidency on its second occasion in Congress in a closed manner, since tradition establishes that if an incumbent president is elected for a new term, he and his family must simply leave the House of Nariño to inaugurate his new term as president and then re-enter Juan Manuel Santos is the most recent incumbent president to be elected for a second term.

Traditions
Since its foundation and throughout its history, acts have been marked that over the years have become part of the tradition of presidential inauguration ceremonies, also some eligible have been suppressed, a clear example was the elimination of the ceremony of the so-called passage through the primate cathedral of Colombia, this act was mandatory during the first inauguration ceremonies and was suppressed together with the 1981 constitution that established the republic of Colombia as a state with the catholic religion as official.

After the ceremonies, the traditional arrival at the house of Nariño is celebrated, an act in which the outgoing president and his family welcome the already incumbent president and his family, this part is the only one in which the outgoing president has a leading role. in the ceremony since tradition dictates that the incoming president does not participate or attend the inauguration ceremony of an incoming president, since the ceremony is attributed to a new government, so the outgoing president simply waits in the house from nariño until 6 in the afternoon where the new president arrives in the company of his family to the door of the house of nariño and after this the former president and his family proceed to take their last walk, part of the tradition is that the new president does not enter the house of nariño until the former president has put one last foot out of the house.

After the traditional one, he arrives at the house of Nariño and the subsequent entrance, the president corresponds to swear in the members of his council of ministers during the rest of the afternoon and when the night comes, a private celebration is usually carried out to the taste of the president.

References 

Presidency of Colombia

Colombian presidential inaugurations